The Blackfoot or Blackfeet are groups of people from the Blackfoot language-speaking nations who constitute the Blackfoot Confederacy that spans Canada and the United States.

Blackfoot or Blackfeet may also refer to:

Places

Canada
 Blackfoot, Alberta
 Blackfoot, British Columbia
 Blackfoot diatreme, a volcanic pipe in British Columbia, Canada

United States
 Blackfoot, Idaho
 Blackfoot, Montana
 Blackfoot, Texas
 Blackfoot Creek, a stream in South Dakota
 Blackfoot Glacier, in Montana
 Blackfoot Mountain, in Montana
 Blackfoot Mountains, in Idaho
 Blackfoot River (disambiguation)
 Blackfoot Dam

Other uses
 Blackfoot language, an Algonquian language spoken by the Blackfoot people
 Sihasapa, or Blackfoot Sioux, a people unrelated to the Blackfoot Confederacy
 Blackfoot (band), an American rock band
 Black foot disease of grapevine, a plant disease
 Blackfoot, a fictional character in the Warriors novel series
 J. Blackfoot (1946–2011), American soul singer
 J. D. Blackfoot (born 1944), an American rock musician
 Melampodium, or blackfoots, a genus of flowering plants in the sunflower family
 Pied-Noir ('Black Feet'), people of French or European origin born in Algeria during French rule 1830–1962
 Tamiya Blackfoot, a radio-controlled model truck

See also

 Gangrene, a type of tissue death that may change skin black